Mortification in Christian theology to the subjective experience of Sanctification, the objective work of God between justification and glorification. It means the 'putting to death' of sin in a believer's life. (Colossians 3:5) Reformed theologian J.I. Packer describes it in the following way: "The Christian is committed to a lifelong fight against the world, the flesh and the devil. Mortification is his assault on the second."  Christians believe that this internal work against sin is empowered by the Holy Spirit and so therefore is also part of regeneration.

Historical Interpretations of Mortification


Roman Catholicism

Roman Catholic theology frames ≈mortification ≈within . According to the Catholic Encyclopedia, "What it slays is the disease of the soul, and by slaying this it restores and invigorates the soul's true life." Mortification is also practiced by some Catholic subgroups for the purpose of saving sinners from hell, as devotees of Our Lady of Fátima believe the Virgin Mary asked her child visionaries to do.

Calvinism and Reformed theology
John Calvin observed that if believers died with Jesus then He would destroy our sinful earthly members and their lust, "so that they may no longer perform their functions." Mortification in Reformed theology has been generally understood to be the subjective experience of sanctification.

See also
 Sanctification
 Regeneration (theology)
 Holy Spirit

References

Further reading
The Mortification of Sin by John Owen

Christian soteriology
Christian terminology